In ancient civilizations, the removal of the human penis was sometimes used to demonstrate superiority or dominance over an enemy. Armies were sometimes known to sever the penises of their enemies to count the dead, as well as for trophies. The practice of castration (removal of the testicles) sometimes involved the removal of all or part of the penis, generally with a tube inserted to keep the urethra open for urination. Castration has been used to create a class of servants or slaves called eunuchs in many different places and eras.

In Russia, men of a devout group of Spiritual Christians known as the Skoptsy were castrated, either undergoing "greater castration", which entailed removal of the penis, or "lesser castration", in which the penis remained in place, while Skoptsy women underwent mastectomy. These procedures were performed in an effort to eliminate lust and to restore the Christian to a pristine state that existed prior to original sin.

In the modern era, removing the human penis for any such activity is very rare (with some exceptions listed below), and references to removal of the penis are almost always symbolic. Castration is less rare, and is performed as a last resort in the treatment of androgen-sensitive prostate cancer.

Penis removal in medicine and psychology

Some men have penile amputations, known as penectomies, for medical reasons. Cancer, for example, sometimes necessitates removal of all or part of the penis. In some instances, botched childhood circumcisions have also resulted in full or partial penectomies. A man who has his penis removed may have one or more problems with his personality, urination, sex life, and vulnerable testicles; he may also experience a phantom penis (see phantom limb).

Genital surgical procedures for transgender women undergoing sex reassignment surgery do not usually involve the complete removal of the penis; part or all of the glans is usually kept and reshaped as a clitoris, and the skin of the penile shaft may also be inverted to form the vagina. When procedures such as this are not possible, other procedures such as colovaginoplasty are used which do involve the removal of the penis.

Issues related to the removal of the penis appear in psychology, for example in the condition known as castration anxiety.

Some men have undergone penectomies as a voluntary body modification, thus including it as part of a body dysmorphic disorder.
Professional opinion is divided regarding the desire for penile amputation as a pathology, much as all other forms of treatment by amputation for body dysmorphic disorder. Voluntary subincision, removal of the glans penis, and bifurcation of the penis are related topics.

History of involuntary penis removal

China 
In ancient China, for crimes including adultery, "licentious" and "promiscuous" activity, males had their penises removed in addition to being castrated. This was one of the Five Punishments that could be legally inflicted on criminals in China. The exact crime was called gong, and referred to "immoral" sex between males and females. The punishment stated, "If a male and female engage in intercourse without morality, their punishments shall be castration and sequestration [respectively]." They were designed to permanently disfigure for life. "Castration", in China, meant the severing of the penis in addition to the testicles, after which male offenders were sentenced to work in the palace as eunuchs. The punishment was called gōngxíng (宫刑), which meant "palace punishment", since castrated men would be enslaved to work in the harem of the palace. It was also called "fǔxíng"(腐刑). Husbands who committed adultery were punished with castration as required under this law.

Japan 
The removal of the penis was used as a punishment for men in the Heian period in Japan, where it replaced execution. It was called rasetsu 羅切 (らせつ), and was separate from castration which was called kyūkei 宮刑 (きゅうけい). Rasetsu was done voluntarily by some Japanese Buddhist priests to ensure celibacy. Rasetsu was also known in Edo period Japan.

The word rasetsu was made out of the components "ra" from "mara" which meant penis, and "setsu", which meant cutting.

The word rasetsu was used in Japanese literature.

Kyūkei in Japanese law referred to the punishment of castration, which was used for male offenders, and confinement for females.

Arab slave trade
The Arab slave trade provided many eunuchs who were more highly prized, and priced. African boys were generally subject to penis removal, as well as castration.

Treatment and effects of penis removal

A study of penis reattachment in China found that in a group of 50 men, all but one reacquired functionality, even though some involved full reconstructive surgery using tissue and bone. Reportedly, some of these men later fathered children.

Phalloplasty

If reattachment is not an option (such as the penis not being reattached long after 24 hours), doctors can reconstruct a penis from muscle and skin grafted from another part of the body like the forearm. However, a penile implant is needed for an erection to be possible, as the reconstructed penis would look strange and would either not be able to ejaculate, or ejaculate with less force. Patients are often dissatisfied with the reconstructed penis. Since 2015, Zephyr Surgical Implants produces malleable and inflatable penile implants particularly designed for phalloplasty surgeries. Standing during urination is an advantage offered by a reconstructed penis. If penis reconstruction is not done, the patient will have to squat in order to urinate since doctors reroute the entrance of the urethra to below the scrotum.

Penis transplantation

In the 21st century successful allographic penis transplantation surgery began.

See also 
 Aphallia, a condition where the phallus (penis or clitoris) is absent
 Apophallation, Amputation of the penis in some species of air-breathing land slugs
 Castration
 Emasculation
 David Reimer – A Canadian man whose penis was removed during circumcision.
 John and Lorena Bobbitt
 Nullo
 Genital retraction syndrome
 Penectomy
 Sada Abe
 Skoptsy

References 

Male genital surgery
Male genital modification
Human penis
Violence against men